Terme Vigliatore (Sicilian: Tèrmini Vigghiaturi) is a comune (municipality) in the Metropolitan City of Messina in the Italian region Sicily, located about  east of Palermo and about  west of Messina at the mouth of the Patrì river.  
Terme Vigliatore borders the following municipalities: Barcellona Pozzo di Gotto, Castroreale, Furnari, Mazzarrà Sant'Andrea, Rodì Milici.

A Roman villa of the 1st century BC, with 53 rooms, is situated in the hamlet of Saint Biagio.

References

External links
 Official website

Cities and towns in Sicily
Roman villas in Italy
Roman sites of Sicily